Khepri (Egyptian: ḫprj, also transliterated Khepera, Kheper, Khepra, Chepri) is a scarab-faced god in ancient Egyptian religion who represents the rising or morning sun. By extension, he can also represent creation and the renewal of life.<ref name=":1">van Ryneveld, Maria M. The Presence and Significance of Khepri in Egyptian Religion and Art, University of Pretoria (South Africa), Ann Arbor, 1992. .</ref>

Symbolism
Khepri (ḫprj) is derived from the Egyptian language verb ḫpr, meaning to "develop", "come into being", or "create". The god was connected to and often depicted as a scarab beetle (ḫprr in Egyptian).  Young dung beetles, having been laid as eggs within the dung ball, emerge from it fully formed and thus were considered to have been created from nothingness. Egyptians believed that each day the sun was also reborn or created from nothing.  In the same way that the beetle pushes large balls of dung along the ground, Khepri moved the newly-born sun across the sky.  Khepri was a solar deity and thus connected to the rising sun and the mythical creation of the world. The god and the scarab beetle represent creation and rebirth.

Religion
There was no cult devoted to Khepri, and he was largely subordinate to the greater sun god Ra. The sun god was however included in the creationist theory of Heliopolis and later Thebes.  Often, Khepri and another solar deity, Atum, were seen as aspects of Ra: Khepri was the morning sun, Ra was the midday sun, and Atum was the sun in the evening. As a deity, Khepri's four main functions were creator, protector, sun-god, and the god of resurrection.  The central belief surrounding Khepri was the god's ability to renew life, in the same way he restored the sun's existence every morning.  Mummified scarab beetles and scarab amulets have been found in Pre-dynastic graves, indicating that Khepri was respected early on in the history of Ancient Egypt.

 Appearance 

Khepri was principally depicted as a scarabaeus sacer scarab beetle, though in some tomb paintings and funerary papyri he is represented as a human male with a scarab as a head, or as a scarab with a male human head emerging from the beetle's shell. He is also depicted as a scarab in a solar barque held aloft by Nun. The scarab amulets that the Egyptians used as jewelry and as seals allude to Khepri and the newborn sun.  The beetle carvings became so common that excavators find them throughout the Mediterranean.  
left|thumb|On this relief panel, Khepri is depicted solely as a scarab beetle.  Above his head the sun god holds the Duat, a symbol for the afterlife.  The scarab stands on a sun disk with sun rays extending downwards.

Etymology
The name "Khepri" appears most often in the Pyramid texts and usually has the scarab hieroglyph as a determinative or ideogram. Khepri (ḫprj) can also be spelled "Kheper", which is the Egyptian term used to denote the sun god, the scarab beetle, and the verb "to come into existence". 

Kheper could also stand for "to change", "to happen''" etc.

Origin 
It is thought that Khepri came into existence in the same manner as a young scarab beetle emerges from its dung ball fully formed.  

Ancient Egyptians used to think, the beetles express the sun's motion by rolling their feces on the sand, which is why the sun god Khepri is associated with this particular species of beetle.

Khepri was considered below the sun god Ra in rank, so no shrine was built for him. Another sun-god Atum and Khepri are often considered to be part of Ra. As stated in The Book of the Dead, Khepri was also sometimes believed to be a part of Atum.

See also 
Solar Myths

References

External links

Animal gods
Egyptian gods
Solar gods
Creator gods
Life-death-rebirth gods
Stellar gods
Mythological insects
Beetles and humans
Ra
Personifications
Insects in religion
Beetles